Tony Young (born 24 December 1952 in Urmston, Lancashire) is an English former footballer who made 181 appearances in the Football League playing as a full back for Manchester United, Charlton Athletic and York City.

References

External links
 Photo and details at Sporting Heroes

1952 births
Living people
People from Urmston
English footballers
Association football fullbacks
Manchester United F.C. players
Charlton Athletic F.C. players
York City F.C. players
Runcorn F.C. Halton players
English Football League players